Hire Manik Jale is a Bengali adventure novella written by Bibhutibhushan Bandopadhyay published in 1946.

Synopsis
Sushil, a brave Bengali boy meets Jamatullah and goes to an adventure to an island of Dutch East Indies with Sanat and Jamatullah, where they find a cave and many diamonds and other precious stones. But unfortunately dangers await for them there.

Characters
Sushil
Jamatullah
Sanat
Yaar Hossein

References

Adventure novels
20th-century Indian novels
Indian Bengali-language novels
Novels by Bibhutibhushan Bandyopadhyay
1946 novels
Indian mystery novels